Public sector consulting usually refers to the branch of management consulting that works with local and federal governments as well as government agencies. Several major management consulting firms (e.g.: McKinsey, BCG, Booz&Co, Monitor, PA Consulting Group) do public sector engagements as part of their overall business.

Like management consulting, the goal of public sector consulting is to help organizations improve their performance, primarily through the analysis of existing problems and the development of plans for improvement.

Public sector consulting covers a wide range of areas, including:

 Education
 Defense
 Healthcare
 Environmental policy
 Energy
 Economics & strategic planning
 Technology
 Transportation
 Welfare, Government Aid and Economics

Consultants are usually brought in as experts or facilitators on a given project.

Political consulting
Consulting
Strategy consulting